This list of Crayon Shin-chan films features feature-length films based on the manga and anime series Crayon Shin-chan. Since 1993, all of these films to date have been released by Toho. Toho currently holds worldwide distribution and licensing rights for all of the films in the series.

Feature films

References

External links 
 

Lists of films based on manga
Lists of anime films

Lists of films by franchise